Jaclyn "Jax" A. Smith is a Canadian actress from Toronto, Ontario.

Biography
She has worked in television, film and theater. She has appeared as a guest-star on the hit sci-fi television series Eureka and as Jill (aka "Jill the Thrill") alongside actor Eugene Levy in two American Pie direct-to-video spin-offs, The Naked Mile and Beta House. She is also featured in the latter's deleted scenes section, entitled "Lightning Bolts of Zeus.".

Smith appeared as Joan of Arx on Canada's Space Channel. Other television credits include 72 Hours: True Crime. She has performed for the stage with the Soulpepper Theatre Company, Motley Theater Company, Festival of Original Theater, Not 2B Confused, Players Academy and Artists Play Showcase. Smith is also a professional dancer, having studied with the Toronto Dance Theatre, American Ballet Theatre and Kirov Academy of Ballet.

Smith organized and hosted an Earth Hour 2008 event in Vancouver. The event had over 150 attendees and was broadcast live online. She also wrote, produced, directed, and starred in an Earth Hour public service announcement/music video Flicking The Lights Off. which made its debut on the Vancouver talk show Urban Rush, was screened at the 2008 Projecting Change Vancouver Green Film Festival, the Celluloid Social Club and Vancouver's Car Free Community Fest.

Filmography
 72 Hours: True Crime (1 episode, "Good Doctor", 2006) — Candice Fohagy
 American Pie Presents: The Naked Mile (2006) (V) — Jill
 American Pie Presents: Beta House (2007) (V) — Jill
 Eureka (1 episode, "What About Bob?", 2008) — Grace

References

External links
 
 Just-jax.blogspot.com
 Oakvillebeaver.com
 Spacecast.com

Canadian film actresses
Canadian television actresses
Canadian stage actresses
Living people
Actresses from Toronto
Year of birth missing (living people)